Stock Car Races is a Canadian sports television series which aired on CBC Television in 1953 and 1954.

Premise
For two years, during the annual racing season from May to August, CBC featured remote broadcasts of stock car races from Toronto's Exhibition Place.

Scheduling
This hour-long series was broadcast Fridays at 8:30 p.m. (Eastern) for two seasons, from 8 May to 14 August 1953 and from 28 May to 6 August 1954.

References

External links
 

CBC Television original programming
1950s Canadian sports television series
1953 Canadian television series debuts
1954 Canadian television series endings
Black-and-white Canadian television shows
Sports telecast series